Johnny Johnny Yes Papa is a 2018 Indian Kannada-language action film directed and written by Preetham Gubbi. The film is made under the Duniya Talkies banner owned by actor Duniya Vijay who also plays the lead role. The film is a sequel to their previous venture Johny Mera Naam Preethi Mera Kaam (2011). The rest of the principal cast include Rachita Ram, Rangayana Raghu and Sadhu Kokila. The film's soundtrack is composed by B. Ajaneesh Loknath.

The first look teaser of the film was released on 19 January 2018 on YouTube.

The name of the film originates from the nursery rhyme Johny Johny Yes Papa.

Cast
 Duniya Vijay as Johnny
 Rachita Ram as Priya
 Rangayana Raghu as Pappa
 Achyuth Kumar as Priya's father 
 Sadhu Kokila as Dr. Halappa
 Master Hemanth as Beeja aka B Jayaram
 Raghu Pandeshwar as Inspector Rakshit Shetty 
 Nagabhushana as Rahul
 Zachary Coffin as Peter
 Mayuri as Angel, Extend Cameo appearance
 Preetham Gubbi as Preetam, the groom 
 Gaddappa as House Owner 
 Girija Lokesh as Dr.Ramachandra's mother
 Agnisakshi Priyanka as Drama Artist

Reception
A review in the Deccan Herald criticised the film's screenwriting and Tabala Nani's dialogue, praising Vijay's "brilliant dialogue delivery" as the film's only consolation.

Soundtrack

The film's soundtracks are composed by B. Ajaneesh Loknath. The music rights were acquired by Jio Music.

References

External links
 
 Johnny Johnny Yes Papa (2018)

2010s Kannada-language films
2010s romantic action films
Indian romantic action films
Indian sequel films
Films shot in Bangalore
Films directed by Preetham Gubbi
2018 masala films